Willow Banks is a hamlet and semi-rural locality of Murray Bridge on the east (left) bank of the Murray River. It is adjacent to the east-bank localities of Murrawong, on the west, and Sunnyside and Greenbanks on the east. Willowbanks Way is the only road within the locality, and is accessible only via Aroona Road, Sunnyside.

References 

Towns in South Australia